Blades of Thunder 2, also sold as Battle Hawks 2, is a flight simulator game developed by Interactive Visison A/S's Polish studio and published by Summitsoft Entertainment for the Nintendo DS. It was released on April 18, 2006 in North America. It received poor reviews, with GameSpot saying that "There's nothing fun or exciting about flying helicopters in Blades of Thunder II. And considering that's all you do in the game, that's really sad."

References

2006 video games
Combat flight simulators
Helicopter video games
Nintendo DS games
Nintendo DS-only games
Video games developed in Poland